This is a list of science fiction horror films.

0-9
4D Man (1959)
9 (2009)
9 (2019)

A

B

C

D

E

F

G

H

I

J

K

L

M

N

O
The Omega Man (1971)
Outland (1981)
Outpost:
Outpost (2008)
Outpost II: Black Sun (2011)
Outpost III: Rise of the Spetsnaz (2013)
Overlord (2018)

P

Q

R

S

T

U

V

W

X

Y

Z
Zaat (1971)
Zombie Wars (2007)
Zone of the Dead (2009)

See also
 Lists of horror films
 Lists of science fiction films
 List of comic science fiction films
 List of science fiction action films

References

 
Horror
Lists of horror films